Xie He (fl. 6th century) was a Chinese art historian, art critic, painter, and writer of the Liu Song and Southern Qi dynasties who wrote the "Six principles of Chinese painting" (繪畫六法, Huìhuà Liùfǎ) in the preface to his book The Record of the Classification of Old Painters (古畫品錄, Gǔhuà Pǐnlù).

Six principles of Chinese Painting

According to Xie He, the six elements that define a painting are:

 "Spirit Resonance" ( 气韵) or vitality ( 生动), and seems to translate to the nervous energy transmitted from the artist into the work. The overall energy of a work of art. Xie He said that without Spirit Resonance, there was no need to look further. 
 "Bone Method" ( 骨法) or the way of using the brush ( 用笔). This refers not only to texture and brush stroke, but also to the close link between handwriting and personality. In his day, the art of calligraphy was inseparable from painting.
 "Correspondence to the Object" ( 应物) or the depicting of form ( 象形), which would include shape and line.
 "Suitability to Type" ( 随类) or the application of color ( 赋彩), including layers, value and tone.
 "Division and Planning" ( 经营) or placing and arrangement ( 位置), corresponding to composition, space and depth.
 "Transmission by Copying" ( 传移) or the copying of models ( 模写), not only from life but also the works of antiquity.

References

5th-century Chinese historians
Chinese art critics
Chinese art historians
Southern Qi historians
Southern Qi painters
Liu Song historians
Liu Song painters
Year of birth missing
Year of death missing